The News Corporation scandal involves phone, voicemail, and computer hacking that were allegedly committed over a number of years. The scandal began in the United Kingdom, where the News International phone hacking scandal has to date resulted in the closure of the News of the World newspaper and the resignation of a number of senior members of the Metropolitan Police force.

Pre-2010

2010 - 4 July 2011

After 4 July 2011
 

 

 

 

 
 
 

 
 

 Leveson inquiry has first hearing.
 
 
. The Leveson Inquiry provides background, scope, and procedural plans for the inquiry.

Investigations

 2003 - Operation Motorman 
 2003 - Operation Glade
 2003 - House of Commons Select Committee on Culture, Media and Sport investigation into privacy and media intrusion
 2006 - Hayman investigation into Royal Family phone hacking conducted by Metropolitan Police's Specialist Operations directorate. 
 2009 - John Yates review of 2006 Hayman investigation 
 2011 - Operation Weeting, Investigation conducted by Scotland Yard's Specialist Crime Directorate
 2011 - Operation Elveden, Metropolitan Police investigation being led by Deputy Assistant Commissioner Sue Akers
 2011 - House of Commons Select Committee on Culture, Media and Sport investigation
 June 2011 - Operation Tuleta
 July 2011 - Leveson Inquiry
 July 2011 - US Department of Justice investigation

References

See also

 CTB v News Group Newspapers
 Mosley v News Group Newspapers Limited
 Sheridan v News International

British journalism
News Corporation scandal